The men's light welterweight event was part of the boxing programme at the 1976 Summer Olympics. The weight class allowed boxers of up to 63.5 kilograms to compete. The competition was held from 18 to 31 July 1976. 31 boxers from 31 nations competed.

Medalists

Results
The following boxers took part in the event:

First round
 Narong Boonfuang (THA) def. José Manuel Gómet (ESP), KO-1
 Christian Sittler (AUT) def. Luis Godoy (COL), 4:1
 Jesús Navas (VEN) def. Jones Okoth (UGA), walk-over
 Ulrich Beyer (GDR) def. C.C. Machaiah (IND), 5:0
 Francisco de Jesus (BRA) def. Girmaye Gabre (ETH), walk-over
 Philip Mathenge (KEN) – Hamidou Yagho (BUR), both walk-over
 Ismael Martínez (PUR) def. Siergot Sully (HAI), 5:0
 Clinton McKenzie (GBR) def. Daniele Zappaterra (ITA), 5:0
 Ray Leonard (USA) def. Ulf Carlsson (SWE), 5:0
 Valeri Limasov (URS) def. Robert Colley (NZL), DSQ-3

Second round
 Calistrat Cuțov (ROM) def. Jean-Claude Ruiz (FRA), 5:0
 Jamsul Harahap (INA) def. Moro Tahiru (GHA), walk-over
 Vladimir Kolev (BUL) def. Tai Shik-Park (KOR), 5:0
 Ernst Müller (FRG) def. Karim Ibrahim (NIG), walk-over
 Andrés Aldama (CUB) def. Sabahattin Bürçü (TUR), RSC-2
 Jesus Sánchez (DOM) def. Mark Harris (GUY), walk-over
 József Nagy (HUN) def. Obisia Nwakpa (NGA), walk-over
 Chris Clarke (CAN) def. Lasse Friman (FIN), 5:0
 Sodnomyn Gombo (MGL) def. Messan Langhan (TOG), walk-over
 Kazimierz Szczerba (POL) def. Josiah Nhlengethwa (SUA), walk-over
 Luis Portillo (ARG) def. Farouk Chanchoun (IRQ), walk-over
 Christian Sittler (AUT) def. Narong Boonfuang (THA), KO-2
 Ulrich Beyer (GDR) def. Jesús Navas (VEN), 5:0
 Francisco de Jesus (BRA) – no opponent (bye)
 Clinton McKenzie (GBR) def. Ismael Martínez (PUR), 3:2
 Ray Leonard (USA) def. Valeri Limasov (URS), 5:0

Third round
 Calistrat Cuțov (ROM) def. Jamsul Harahap (INA), 5:0
 Vladimir Kolev (BUL) def. Ernst Müller (FRG), 5:0
 Andrés Aldama (CUB) def. Jesus Sánchez (DOM), RSC-2
 József Nagy (HUN) def. Chris Clarke (CAN), RSC-3
 Kazimierz Szczerba (POL) def. Sodnomyn Gombo (MGL), 3:2
 Luis Portillo (ARG) def. Christian Sittler (AUT), KO-2
 Ulrich Beyer (GDR) def. Francisco de Jesus (BRA), 5:0
 Ray Leonard (USA) def. Clinton McKenzie (GBR), 5:0

Quarterfinals
 Vladimir Kolev (BUL) def. Calistrat Cuțov (ROM), 5:0
 Andrés Aldama (CUB) def. József Nagy (HUN), AB-2
 Kazimierz Szczerba (POL) def. Luis Portillo (ARG), 5:0
 Ray Leonard (USA) def. Ulrich Beyer (GDR), 5:0

Semifinals
 Andrés Aldama (CUB) def. Vladimir Kolev (BUL), KO-1
 Ray Leonard (USA) def. Kazimierz Szczerba (POL), 5:0

Final
 Ray Leonard (USA) def. Andrés Aldama (CUB), 5:0

References

Light Welterweight